The 2018 Cork Premier Intermediate Hurling Championship was the 15th staging of the Cork Premier Intermediate Hurling Championship since its establishment by the Cork County Board in 2004. The draw for the opening round took place on 10 December 2017. The championship began on 15 April 2018 and ended on 29 October 2018.

On 29 October 2018, Charleville won the championship after a 0-15 to 0-14 defeat of Courcey Rovers in a final replay at Páirc Uí Rinn. It was their first ever championship title in this grade.

Tadhg O'Sullivan from the Courcey Rovers club was the championship's top scorer with 1-49.

Teams

A total of 16 teams contested the Premier Intermediate Championship, including 14 teams from the 2017 premier intermediate championship, one promoted team from the 2017 intermediate championship and one relegated team from the 2017 senior championship.

Team changes

To Championship

Relegated from the Cork Senior Hurling Championship
 Youghal

Promoted from the Cork Intermediate Hurling Championship
 Aghada

From Championship

Relegated to the Cork Intermediate Hurling Championship
 Tracton

Promoted to the Cork Senior Hurling Championship
 Kanturk

Fixtures/results

Round 1

Round 2

Relegation play-off

Round 3

Quarter-finals

Semi-finals

Finals

Championship statistics

Top scorers

Top scorer overall

Top scorers in a single game

References

External links

 2018 Cork Premier Intermediate Hurling Championship fixtures and results 

Cork Premier Intermediate Hurling Championship
Cork Premier Intermediate Hurling Championship